Alan Silvius Reiher (13 June 19273 August 2003) was a senior Australian public servant, best known for his time as Director-General of Works in the Australian Government bureaucracy and for heading government transport agencies in New South Wales and Victoria.

Life and career
Alan Reiher was born in Melbourne on 13 June 1927 to Silvius Thomas Reiher and Agnes Marion Reiher.

Having graduated from the University of Melbourne with a civil engineering degree, Reiher commenced his Australian Public Service career in 1957 as an Engineer in the Department of Works. He spent a year at the Harvard Business School soon before being appointed Director-General of the department in 1967.

In 1975 while Secretary of the Department of Housing and Construction, Reiher was appointed as a member of the Darwin Reconstruction Authority in the aftermath of Cyclone Tracy.

He was appointed the Chief Commissioner of the New South Wales Public Transport Commission in March 1976 succeeding Philip Shirley. The appointment was in the last weeks of the Wills Government, and the Labor Party opposed his appointment, which was for seven years.

After being placed on fully paid leave by Minister for Transport Peter Cox, who claimed Reiher had caused him embarrassment by failing to inform him of an agreement with the unions in March 1980, Reiher resigned.

In 1980 he was appointed Chairman of the Victorian Railways Board, and in 1982 he became Director-General of Transport for Victoria.

Beginning in 1986 for five years, Reiher was Victoria's Commissioner in North America. Reiher died on 3 August 2003.

References

Australian public servants
University of Melbourne alumni
1927 births
2003 deaths